Sitting Ducks first aired on September 13, 2001. Each episode of Sitting Ducks contained two separate stories. The episodes were run weekly up until the start of November, when the show came to a halt until picking back up in February, running weekly again until the end of the first season. Just after a year the second season begun; it contained the same two-story format for each episode and also had thirteen episodes like the first season.

Overview

Episodes

Season 1 (2001–02)

Season 2 (2003)

References 

Lists of American children's animated television series episodes
Lists of Canadian children's animated television series episodes